

Headline event of the year
Roger Maris hits 61 home runs, breaking Babe Ruth's record.

Champions

Major League Baseball
World Series: New York Yankees over Cincinnati Reds (4–1); Whitey Ford, MVP
All-Star Game (#1), July 11 at Candlestick Park: National League, 5-4 (10 innings)
All-Star Game (#2), July 31 at Fenway Park: 1–1 tie (9 innings, rain)

Other champions
College World Series: USC
Japan Series: Yomiuri Giants over Nankai Hawks (4–2)
Little League World Series: Northern, El Cajon, California
Senior League World Series: Natrona Heights, Pennsylvania

Awards and honors
Baseball Hall of Fame
 Max Carey
 Billy Hamilton
Most Valuable Player
Roger Maris (AL)
Frank Robinson (NL)
Cy Young Award
Whitey Ford, New York Yankees
Rookie of the Year
Don Schwall (AL)
Billy Williams (NL)
Gold Glove Award
Vic Power (1B) (AL) 
Bobby Richardson (2B) (AL) 
Brooks Robinson (3B) (AL) 
Luis Aparicio (SS) (AL) 
Jim Landis (OF) (AL) 
Al Kaline (OF) (AL) 
Jimmy Piersall (OF) (AL) 
Earl Battey (C) (AL) 
Frank Lary (P) (AL)

MLB statistical leaders

Major league baseball final standings

American League final standings

National League final standings

Events

January

January 9 - The Cleveland Indians release pitcher Don Newcombe
January 29 – Billy Hamilton and Max Carey are voted into the Hall of Fame by the Veterans Committee.

February
February 7 – Boston Red Sox outfielder Jackie Jensen makes a return to the major leagues by signing a $40,000 contract. Jensen had retired in 1960 due to a fear of flying. Jensen will hit .263 with 13 home runs in 1961.

March
March – The Cuban government, led by Fidel Castro, abolishes professional baseball and ends the Cuban League, which was started in 1878, and the Serie Nacional de Béisbol is established.
March 6 – The New York Metropolitan Baseball Club Inc. formally receives a certificate of membership from National League President Warren Giles.

April
April 10 — In the traditional "Presidential Opener" in Washington, D.C., the Chicago White Sox defeat the Washington Senators, 4–3, with John F. Kennedy throwing out the first pitch before a crowd of 26,725. The Senators are an expansion team created expressly to replace the preceding team of the same name that moved to Minneapolis–Saint Paul over the winter. The 1961 season is the first of the expansion era, and this Presidential Opener is the last in the history of Griffith Stadium, Washington's venerable baseball park.
April 11
At Fenway Park, Boston Red Sox rookie Carl Yastrzemski gets a hit off Ray Herbert of the Kansas City Athletics. It is the first of 3,318 hits that Yastrzemski will amass over an illustrious 23-year career.
The Los Angeles Angels play the first game in franchise history, defeating the Baltimore Orioles team, 7–2. For the Angels, Ted Kluszewski hits two home runs while Eli Grba pitches a complete game.
At Yankee Stadium, the Minnesota Twins shut out the New York Yankees, 6–0, in their first game since their move from Washington, D.C. Pedro Ramos is the winning pitcher, helping himself with a two-run single while allowing just three singles in beating Yankees starter, Whitey Ford.
Philadelphia Phillies pitcher Robin Roberts ties Grover Cleveland Alexander's National League record with a 12th-straight Opening Day start‚ but Philadelphia loses 6–2 to Don Drysdale and the Los Angeles Dodgers. Roberts is now 5-6 on Opening Day.
April 21 – The Minnesota Twins play their very first home game in franchise history, losing to the team that coincidentally replaced them in the nation's capital, the Washington Senators 5–3.
April 22 – The Boston Red Sox snap a 13-game losing streak in Chicago's Comiskey Park by edging the Chicago White Sox 7–6 on Pumpsie Green's 11th-inning home run.
April 27 – The Los Angeles Angels drew a crowd of 11,931 for their home opener against the Minnesota Twins at Los Angeles' Wrigley Field. Ty Cobb, in his last appearance at a ball park, throws out the ceremonial first pitch. Minnesota starter Camilo Pascual spoils the opener by winning, 4–2, sending the Angels to their eighth loss in nine games.
April 30 – San Francisco Giants slugger Willie Mays became the ninth player to hit four home runs in a single game as the Giants beat the Milwaukee Braves, 14–4, at Milwaukee's County Stadium.

May
May 8 – New York's expansion National League club announces that the team nickname will be "Mets," a natural shortening of the corporate name ("New York Metropolitan Baseball Club, Inc.")
May 9 – The Baltimore Orioles' Jim Gentile hits a grand slam in both the first and second innings in a game against the Minnesota Twins, and finishes with nine RBI in the game.
May 31 – Boston Red Sox outfielder Carroll Hardy pinch-hits for rookie Carl Yastrzemski. On September 20, 1960, Hardy pinch hit for Ted Williams, making him the only player to go in for both future Hall of Famers. Hardy also hit his first major league home run pinch-hitting for Roger Maris when both were at Cleveland (May 18, 1958).

June
June 12 The Cleveland Indians sign free agent pitcher Tommy John.
June 20 - After releasing him as a player, the Pittsburgh Pirates bring back Gene Baker as a player/manager of the Batavia Pirates of the New York-Penn league. The hiring is significant because Baker becomes the first African-American manager of a minor league team with a major league affiliate.  Baker leads the team to a third place finish, but they lose in the league finals to the Olean Red Sox. 
June 29 – Willie Mays hits 3 home runs helping the San Francisco Giants beat the Philadelphia Phillies 8-7.

July
July 4 
Willie Mays hits his 300th career home run off pitcher Jack Curtis, leading the San Francisco Giants to a 4–1 victory over the Chicago Cubs at Wrigley Field.
In the first game of an Independence Day double-header at Metropolitan Stadium, Minnesota Twins pinch-hitter Julio Bécquer hits the first recorded ever four-pitcher walk-off grand slam in Major League Baseball history. Chicago White Sox starter Billy Pierce, up 4–2 in the ninth inning en route to a complete game, allows a single to Bob Allison. As a result, Pierce is relieved by Russ Kemmerer, who allows other single to Earl Battey. Frank Baumann then is brought in and he walks Lenny Green to load the bases. Afterwards, White Sox manager Al López summons Warren Hacker from the bullpen while Twins manager Sam Mele counters with Bécquer, who puts the ball over the right field fence for the walk-off homer and a 6–4 victory.
In the second game of the double-header, Minnesota Twins slugger Harmon Killebrew hits a three-run home run, which will be the only inside-the-park home run of the 573 homers he will hit in his distinguished career.
July 11 – Strong winds at Candlestick Park dominate the first All-Star Game of the season. A capacity crowd sees pitcher Stu Miller blown off the mound in the ninth inning resulting in balk being called, and it enables the American League to forge a 3–3 tie before losing 5–4 in 10 innings.
July 17 – Commissioner Ford Frick decrees that Babe Ruth's record of 60 home runs in a 154-game schedule in 1927 "cannot be broken unless some batter hits 61 or more within his club's first 154 games." Two days later, Frick, an old friend of Ruth, announces that should Ruth's record be beaten after 154 games, the record will carry an asterisk. When asked about the ruling, Roger Maris replies, "A season is a season."
July 31 – At Fenway Park, the second All-Star Game of the year ends in a 1–1 tie as heavy rain halted play. It is the first tie in All-Star history.

August
August 11 – Warren Spahn of the Milwaukee Braves records his 300th career win.
August 20 – The Philadelphia Phillies snap a modern-day record 23-game losing streak, defeating the Milwaukee Braves 7-4 in the second game of a doubleheader at Milwaukee County Stadium. Phillie pitcher John Buzhardt goes the distance for the victory; he had also been the winning pitcher in the Phillies' last victory prior to the start of the losing streak, on July 28 against the San Francisco Giants.
August 20 – Two Minnesota Twins pitchers homer off two Los Angeles Angels pitchers, to become the sixth (and last) pitching duo to homer in the same game. Starter Jack Kralick leads off the third inning with a homer off Jim Donohue, and Al Schroll hits a lead-off homer in the eighth off Art Fowler. 
August 21 - The Baltimore Orioles purchase the contract of Charley Lau from the Milwaukee Braves. 
August 22 – Roger Maris becomes the first player to hit his 50th home run of the season in the month of August as the Yankees lose to the Los Angeles Angels 4-3. Angels' pitcher Ken McBride tees up the gopher ball in the 6th inning with one on.
August 23 – At Crosley Field, the Giants hit five home runs in a 12-run ninth inning, beating the host Cincinnati Reds 14-0.
August 24 – Ageless Satchel Paige signs with the Portland Beavers of the Pacific Coast League. in 25 innings for Portland, he will have a 2.88 ERA.

September
September 1 – Paul Richards resigned as manager of the Baltimore Orioles to become the new General Manager of the new Houston National League club. The club would be known as the Houston Colt .45s. Lum Harris takes over as manager of the Orioles.
September 2 – Milwaukee Braves manager Chuck Dressen (71–58) is fired and executive vice president Birdie Tebbetts becomes the new Braves manager.
September 14 – At Busch Stadium, the St. Louis Cardinals and the Chicago Cubs set a National League record by using 72 players in a double header. The Cardinals prevailed with 37 players and won twice, 8–7 in a regular nine-inning game and then 6–5 in 11 innings. St. Louis' Ken Boyer posted a 7-for-11 day, hitting for the cycle in the nitecap and completing it by belting a walk-off home run in the bottom of the 11th.
September 26 :
The Cincinnati Reds clinch their first National League pennant since 1940. Home runs by OF Frank Robinson and pinch hitter Jerry Lynch (a tie breaker in the 8th inning) give the Reds an 8–3 win over the Chicago Cubs at Wrigley Field.
Roger Maris of the New York Yankees hits his major league record-tying 60th home run of the season, a third inning solo shot against Jack Fisher of the Baltimore Orioles.

October
October 1 – Before a small crowd at Yankee Stadium, New York Yankees outfielder Roger Maris smacks a 2–0 pitch into right field for his 61st home run of the season (a record that would last until Mark McGwire broke it in ).  The home run is number 240 for the Yankees, which sets a major league single-season record.
October 9 – In Game Five of the World Series, Johnny Blanchard and Héctor López spark a five-run first inning and 13–5 win for the New York Yankees over the Cincinnati Reds. Blanchard and López hit home runs, and López drives in five runs. Bud Daley's long relief effort wraps up the Series, as Ralph Houk becomes the third rookie manager to guide a World Series winner. Whitey Ford is named the Series MVP.

November
November 16 – The New York Mets logo, designed by sports cartoonist Ray Gatto, is unveiled. The insignia, which is round with orange stitching, represents a baseball. A bridge in the foreground symbolizes that the Mets, in bringing back the National League to New York, represent all five boroughs. The skyline in the background includes a church spire, symbolic of Brooklyn, the Williamsburg Savings Bank, the Woolworth Building, the Empire State Building and the United Nations Building. The Mets' colors are Dodger blue and Giant orange, symbolic of the return of National League baseball to New York after the Dodgers and Giants moved to California.
November 22 – Frank Robinson becomes the first Cincinnati Reds player in 21 years to win the National League MVP Award, taking 219 of 224 possible votes.
November 26 – The Professional Baseball Rules Committee votes 8–1 against legalizing the spitball. Only National League supervisor of umpires Cal Hubbard votes in favor.
November 27 – The Chicago White Sox again trade Chicago fan-favorite Minnie Miñoso, this time to the St. Louis Cardinals in exchange for OF/1B Joe Cunningham.
November 30 – Chicago Cubs outfielder Billy Williams, who hit .278 with 25 home runs and 86 RBI, is selected as the National League Rookie of the Year. Catcher Joe Torre of the Milwaukee Braves (.278, 10, 42) and Cubs pitcher Jack Curtis (10 wins, 4.89 ERA) also receive consideration for the honor.

December
December 2 – MLB clubs vote to curb bonuses. All first-year players not on major rosters, except one minor leaguer, can be drafted by any other club for $8,000. Clubs are expected to be unwilling to pay large bonuses for players who will be subject to a draft for just $8,000.

Births

January
January 3 – John Leister
January 5 – Henry Cotto
January 5 – John Russell
January 5 – Roger Samuels
January 12 – Casey Candaele
January 14 – Joe Redfield
January 15 – Jody Lansford
January 18 – John Bohnet
January 19 – Ken Dowell
January 24 – Tim Barrett
January 29 – Mike Aldrete

February
February 2 – Michael Kay
February 3 – Freddie Toliver
February 9 – John Kruk
February 11 – Steve Springer
February 15 – Mark Davidson
February 21 – Joel Skinner
February 23 – John Morris
February 23 – Mike Smith
February 25 – Dana Kiecker

March
March 3 – Ron Wotus
March 5 – Steve Ontiveros
March 8 – Mark Salas
March 10 – Mike Birkbeck
March 11 – Bryan Oelkers
March 24 – Al Chambers
March 26 – Mike Warren
March 26 – Mickey Weston
March 28 – Glenn Davis
March 29 – Mike Kingery
March 31 – Tracy Jones

April
April 3 – Doug Baker
April 3 – Tim Crews
April 4 – Brad Komminsk
April 9 – Brian Dorsett
April 9 – Kirk McCaskill
April 14 – Jay Aldrich
April 19 – Spike Owen
April 20 – Don Mattingly
April 22 – Jimmy Key
April 26 – Curtis Wilkerson
April 27 – Ray Hayward
April 29 – Wes Gardner
April 29 – Louie Meadows
April 30 – Tony Mack

May
May 3 – Bob Buchanan
May 7 – Manny Hernández
May 19 – Ken Gerhart
May 20 – Ralph Bryant
May 21 – Greg Tabor
May 23 – Kevin Romine
May 25 – Kerwin Danley
May 30 – Jim Steels

June
June 2 – Jeff Schulz
June 3 – José Tolentino
June 8 – Kevin Gross
June 9 – Tom Edens
June 17 – Mickey Brantley
June 17 – Víctor Mata
June 18 – Andrés Galarraga
June 18 – Tom McCarthy
June 19 – Steve Stanicek
June 20 – Gary Varsho

July
July 14 – Vic Rodriguez
July 16 – DeMarlo Hale
July 23 – Chuck Crim
July 27 – Nelson Santovenia

August
August 2 – Danny Sheaffer
August 4 – Mark Wasinger
August 15 – Chris Brown
August 16 – Greg Jelks
August 16 – Donnie Scott
August 18 – Jack Howell
August 19 – Mark Ciardi
August 23 – Tony Ghelfi
August 26 – Ángel Hernández
August 26 – Jeff Parrett
August 27 – Mike Maddux
August 29 – Jeff Kellogg
August 31 – Mike Hartley

September
September 2 – Jeff Russell
September 5 – Tom Dozier
September 6 – Roy Smith
September 9 – Jim Corsi
September 16 – Scott Medvin
September 16 – Mark Parent
September 16 – Chris Pittaro
September 22 – Vince Coleman
September 22 – Bob Geren
September 26 – Steve Buechele
September 28 – Ed Vosberg
September 28 – Kevin Ward

October
October 4 – Mike Sharperson
October 13 – Mike Capel
October 16 – Dave Stapleton
October 16 – Billy Taylor
October 17 – Dan Pasqua
October 19 – Tim Belcher
October 20 – Jerry Meals
October 20 – Keith Smith
October 23 – Jim Presley
October 24 – Rafael Belliard
October 24 – Danny Clay
October 24 – Steve Ziem
October 26 – Gus Polidor
October 27 – Bill Swift
October 28 – Bob Melvin
October 30 – Scott Garrelts
October 30 – Joe Johnson

November
November 4 – Mark Bailey
November 4 – Logan Easley
November 4 – Ángel Salazar
November 5 – Fred Manrique
November 7 – Orlando Mercado
November 10 – Phil Ouellette
November 11 – Pete Coachman
November 11 – Scott May
November 11 – Kevin Towers
November 12 – Greg Gagne
November 15 – Mike Payne
November 18 – Mike Felder
November 19 – Jeff Hearron
November 27 – Randy Milligan

December
December 1 – Herm Winningham
December 4 – Alexis Infante
December 9 – Bruce Tanner
December 11 – Mike Henneman
December 11 – Bob Sebra
December 14 – Jeff Robinson
December 18 – Scott Bailes
December 18 – Dave Hengel
December 21 – Michael Weiner
December 22 – Andy Allanson
December 25 – Rick Renteria
December 26 – Storm Davis
December 26 – Jim Traber
December 31 – Rick Aguilera
December 31 – Steve Engel
December 31 – Donell Nixon

Deaths

January
January 5 – Fred Luderus, 75, Philadelphia Phillies first baseman of the 1910s, captain of the 1915 NL champions
January 8 – Ray Nelson, 85, second baseman who played in 39 games for the 1921 New York Giants
January 8 – Schoolboy Rowe, 50, three-time All-Star pitcher who won 158 games, mainly with the Detroit Tigers (1933–1942) and Philadelphia Phillies (1943 and 1946–1949); member of Detroit's 1935 World Series champions
January 15 – Lefty Capers, 54, pitcher who worked in 15 games for Louisville of the Negro leagues in 1930 and 1931
January 17 – Bud Tinning, 54, pitcher who appeared in 99 games for the 1932–1934 Chicago Cubs and 1935 St. Louis Cardinals; led National League in winning percentage in 1933 (.684)
January 26 – George Hogreiver, 91, outfielder in 123 games for the 1896 Cincinnati Reds and the 1901 Milwaukee Brewers
January 28 – Red Oldham, 67, pitcher for the Detroit Tigers and Pittsburgh Pirates who worked in 176 games over seven seasons between 1914 and 1926; member of 1925 World Series champion Pirates
January 30 – Aaron Ward, 64, second baseman on the New York Yankees' first championship team in 1923; played in 1,059 games for the Yankees (1917–1926), Chicago White Sox (1927) and Cleveland Indians (1928)
January 31 – Guy Cantrell, 56, pitcher who worked in 38 career games over three seasons between 1925 and 1930 for the Brooklyn Robins, Philadelphia Athletics and Detroit Tigers.

February
February 2 – Red Holt, 66, first baseman in 25 games for the 1925 Philadelphia Athletics
February 3 – Dana Fillingim, 67, pitcher who appeared in 200 MLB games between 1915 and 1925, 187 of them for the Boston Braves
February 4 – Parke Carroll, 56, former newspaper sports editor who became a baseball executive; business manager of the Kansas City Athletics from 1955 to 1958, then general manager in 1959 and 1960
February 11 – Pete Shields, 69, first baseman who played 23 games for the Cleveland Indians in April and May 2015 
February 15 – Joe Bean, 86, shortstop who played 50 games for the 1902 New York Giants
February 16 – Dazzy Vance, 69, Hall of Fame pitcher who led the National League in strikeouts seven years in a row, captured 197 MLB victories (190 for Brooklyn) and won the 1924 MVP award
February 17 – Doc Johnston, 73, first baseman in 1,056 games over 11 seasons between 1909 and 1922 as a member of the Cincinnati Reds, Cleveland Naps/Indians, Pittsburgh Pirates and Philadelphia Athletics 
February 19 – Epp Sell, 63, pitcher who appeared in 12 games for the 1922–1923 St. Louis Cardinals
February 19 – Red Smith, 61, shortstop who played 20 games for the Philadelphia Athletics in 1925
February 20 – Otto "Oom Paul" Krueger, 84, shortstop and third baseman in 507 games between 1899 and 1905 for Cleveland, St. Louis, Pittsburgh and Philadelphia, all of the National League
February 23 – Davey Crockett, 85, first baseman who played 28 games for the 1901 Detroit Tigers
February 26 – Happy Smith, 77, outfielder and pinch hitter for the 1910 Brooklyn Superbas

March
March 13 – Joe Berry, 88, catcher for the Philadelphia Phillies for one game in 1902
March 13 – Speed Whatley, 46, outfielder for five Negro leagues clubs (notably the Homestead Grays) between 1937 and 1944; led Negro American League in slugging percentage (.692) as a rookie
March 28 – Jack Coveney, 80, catcher who played four games for 1903 St. Louis Cardinals
March 28 – Powel Crosley Jr., 74, industrialist, inventor and entrepreneur; owner of the Cincinnati Reds from 1934 until his death
March 28 – Jim Hackett, 83, first baseman and pitcher who played in 105 games for the 1902–1903 St. Louis Cardinals

April
April 8 – Fred Brickell, 54, outfielder who appeared in 501 games for the Pittsburgh Pirates and Philadelphia Phillies between 1926 and 1933; father of Fritz Brickell
April 10 – Jim Kelly, 77, outfielder for the National League's Pittsburgh Pirates (1914) and Boston Braves (1918), and Federal League's Pittsburgh Rebels (1915)
April 10 – Branch Rickey Jr., 47, vice president and farm system director of the Pirates since 1951; farm director and assistant general manager of the Brooklyn Dodgers from 1939 to 1950; son of the Hall of Fame baseball executive 
April 15 – Nick Cullop, 73, pitcher for the Cleveland Naps, New York Yankees and St. Louis Browns, who also won 22 games for the 1915 Kansas City Packers in the outlaw Federal League
April 15 – Jess Doyle, 63, pitcher in 55 big-league games between 1925 and 1931, all but one of them for the Detroit Tigers
April 15 – Cy Falkenberg, 81, pitcher who won 130 games over a 12-season career in the American, National and Federal leagues between 1903 and 1917, including 23 for the 1913 Cleveland Naps
April 21 – Lum Davenport, 60, Chicago White Sox southpaw who pitched in 25 games over all or part of four seasons from 1921 to 1924
April 23 – Jack Barry, 73, shortstop of the Philadelphia Athletics' "$100,000 infield", coach since 1921 at Holy Cross, where he won the 1952 College World Series and posted the highest career winning percentage (.806) in collegiate history
April 27 – Frank Gibson, 70, catcher and first baseman in 471 games for the 1913 Detroit Tigers and the 1921–1927 Boston Braves
April 28 – Tommy Connolly, 90, Hall of Fame umpire from 1898 to 1931 who worked the first American League game ever, as well as the first contests at Comiskey Park, Shibe Park, Fenway Park and Yankee Stadium

May
May 8 – Weldon Wyckoff, 70, Philadelphia Athletics right-hander who pitched for the 1913 World Series champions, the 1914 American League champions, and the 1915 A's, who fell all the way into the AL basement with a 43–109 record; Wyckoff went 10–22 for that team; he also appeared briefly for 1916 Athletics and 1916–1918 Boston Red Sox
May 11 – Jack Marshall, 68, pitcher and part-time first baseman who played in the Negro leagues from 1920–1924 and in 1928–1929
May 13 – Al Humphrey, 75, outfielder in eight games for the 1911 Brooklyn Dodgers
May 13 – Binky Jones, 61, shortstop who played in ten games for the 1924 Brooklyn Robins
May 16 – Dick Harley, 86, pitcher who worked in nine games for Boston of the National League in 1905
May 17 – Otto Knabe, 76, second baseman for the Philadelphia Phillies from 1907–1913; also played briefly for Pittsburgh and Chicago of the National League; player-manager for the Baltimore Terrapins of the "outlaw" Federal League
May 17 – Barney Slaughter, 76, pitcher in eight games for the 1910 Phillies
May 21 – Ben Koehler, 84, outfielder and native of Germany who appeared in 208 games for the 1905–1906 St. Louis Browns
May 22 – Mike Regan, 73, pitcher who appeared in 55 games for the Cincinnati Reds between 1917 and 1919
May 28 – Fred Smith, 69, infielder who played 438 career games as a member of the 1913 Boston Braves and 1917 St. Louis Cardinals, as well as for Buffalo and Brooklyn of the Federal League in 1914 and 1915

June
June 4 – Iron Davis, 71, pitcher in 36 games for the New York Highlanders and Boston Braves between 1912 and 1915; threw a no-hit, no-run game against the Philadelphia Phillies on September 9, 1914, the first no-hitter at two-year-old Fenway Park, the Braves' occasional home field that season
June 5 – Syd Smith, 77, catcher who appeared in 146 games between 1908 and 1915 for the Philadelphia Athletics, St. Louis Browns, Cleveland Naps and Pittsburgh Pirates
June 10 – LaRue Kirby, 71, centerfielder who played three games with 1912 New York Giants and 113 games with St. Louis Terriers (Federal League) 
June 11 – Frank Woodward, 67, pitcher in 42 games for the Philadelphia Phillies, St. Louis Cardinals, Washington Senators and Chicago White Sox between 1918 and 1923
June 16 – Benny Bowcock, 81, second baseman for 1903 St. Louis Browns who appeared in 14 games and batted .320 in 50 at bats
June 16 – Mack Hillis, 59, infielder who played 12 MLB games as a member of 1924 New York Yankees and 1928 Pittsburgh Pirates
June 16 – Tullie McAdoo, 76, light-hitting first baseman who appeared in 253 games in the Negro National League, primarily for St. Louis, from 1920 to 1924
June 18 – Eddie Gaedel, 36,  player who, as part of a Bill Veeck stunt promotion, made one official MLB appearance as a pinch hitter for the St. Louis Browns on August 19, 1951
June 21 – Al "Big Dutch" Bergman, 71, second baseman who appeared in eight games for 1916 Cleveland Indians
June 23 – Connie Day, 63, second baseman whose playing career in the Negro leagues extended over ten seasons between 1920 and 1932
June 26 – Bill Collins, 79, outfielder for Boston, Brooklyn and Chicago of the National League and Buffalo of the Federal League in 1910–1911 and 1913–1914
June 30 – Dizzy Dismukes, 71, pitcher in 86 games in Negro leagues over nine seasons between 1920 and 1932; played first base and the outfield in six more career contests and managed eight Negro leagues teams

July
July 3 – Bill Finneran, 83, umpire in National League (1911–1912 and 1923) and Federal League (1915)
July 16 – Mike Mitchell, 81, outfielder who played 1,124 games for the Cincinnati Reds, Chicago Cubs, Pittsburgh Pirates and Washington Senators between 1907 and 1914
July 17 – Ty Cobb, 74, the Detroit Tigers' Hall of Fame center fielder (1905–1926) widely recognized during his lifetime as the greatest player in the sport's history, and holder of more records than any other player, including highest lifetime batting average (.367) and most career hits (4,191), runs (2,245), steals (892), games (3,033) and at bats (11,429); as player-manager of Tigers from 1921–1926, he compiled a 479–443 (.520) record, then finished his baseball career as a player only with Philadelphia Athletics (1927–1928)
July 17 – Ed Reulbach, 78, pitcher who starred for the Chicago Cubs from 1905 to 1913, winning 182 career games
July 18 – Hod Eller, 67, pitcher for the Cincinnati Reds from 1917–1921, including a 1919 World Series game which saw him strike out six Chicago White Sox batters in a row
July 25 – Carlton Molesworth, 85, pitcher in only four games for Washington of the National League in 1895 who went on to a long career as a minor-league manager and scout
July 28 – John Grim, 93, 19th-century catcher who appeared in 708 games for Philadelphia, Louisville and Brooklyn of the National League and Rochester and Milwaukee of the American Association between 1888 and 1899 
July 31 – Bud Weiser, 70, outfielder in 41 games for 1915–1916 Philadelphia Phillies

August
August 2 – Harry Gardner, 74, pitcher in 14 games for the 1911–1912 Pittsburgh Pirates
August 2 – Walter Morris, 81, shortstop in 23 games for the 1908 St. Louis Cardinals, later a longtime minor-league manager and executive who helped to organize 12 different leagues
August 3 – Tom Downey, 77, infielder for the Cincinnati Reds, Philadelphia Phillies and Chicago Cubs (1909–1912), then the Buffalo Bisons of the Federal League (1914–1915)
August 12 – Harry Colliflower, 92, pitcher and outfielder for the 1899 Cleveland Spiders who spent one year, 1910, as an American League umpire
August 17 – Jack McCandless, 70, outfielder in 128 games for Baltimore of the Federal League in 1914 and 1915
August 18 – John Leary, 70, first baseman and catcher in 219 games for the 1914–1915 St. Louis Browns
August 29 – Bill Schwartz, 77, first baseman in 24 games for the 1904 Cleveland Naps

September
September 9 – Jesse Barnes, 69, pitcher who won 152 games for the Boston Braves, New York Giants and Brooklyn Dodgers between 1915 and 1927, including a no-hitter on May 7, 1922, against the Philadelphia Phillies
September 9 – Rube Oldring, 77, outfielder who played mainly for the Philadelphia Athletics, including four pennant winners (1910, 1911, 1913, 1914)
September 11 – Bill "Chink" Outen, 56, lefty-swinging catcher and pinch hitter who appeared in 93 games for the 1933 Brooklyn Dodgers
September 15 – Leon Carlson, 66, relief pitcher who made three appearances for 1920 Washington Senators
September 23 – Ted Jourdan, 66, first baseman who played in 75 games for the Chicago White Sox (1916–1918 and 1920)
September 27 – Bick Campbell, 63, umpire who worked 936 career games in American League (1928–1931) and National League (1938–1940)

October
October 4 – Roy Golden, 73, pitcher who twirled in 37 games for the 1910–1911 St. Louis Cardinals
October 14 – Clyde Southwick, 74, catcher who played four games for the 1911 St. Louis Browns
October 17 – Harry Felix, 86, pitcher in ten games for the New York Giants and Philadelphia Phillies in 1901 and 1902 
October 21 – Harry Gleason, 86, infielder/outfielder who played from 1901 through 1905 for the Boston Americans and St. Louis Browns
October 29 – Tom Cafego, 50, left fielder, pinch hitter and pinch runner who appeared in four games for 1937 St. Louis Browns

November
November 1 – Tom Hughes, 77, pitcher for the New York Highlanders (1906–1907 and 1909–1910) and Boston Braves (1914–1918); threw a no-hit, no-run game against Pittsburgh on June 16, 1916
November 3 – Freddie Maguire, 62, second baseman who played in 618 games for New York Giants, Chicago Cubs and Boston Braves over six seasons between 1922 and 1931 
November 6 – Roy Hartzell, 80, outfielder, third baseman and shortstop who appeared in 1,290 games for the St. Louis Browns and New York Highlanders/Yankees between 1906 and 1916
November 17 – Benny Kauff, 71, "the Ty Cobb of the Feds," outfielder who won back-to-back batting (.370 and .342) and stolen base (75 and 55) titles in the 1914–1915 Federal League, then considered an "outlaw" circuit but now recognized as a major league; also played for New York Highlanders of the American League and New York Giants of the National; banned from baseball by Commissioner Kenesaw Mountain Landis after he was tried and found innocent on charges of car theft in 1920
November 23 – Nick Carter, 82, pitcher in 14 games for the 1908 Philadelphia Athletics
November 27 – Bob Harmon, 74, pitcher for the St. Louis Cardinals and Pittsburgh Pirates from 1909 to 1918; won 23 games for 1911 Cardinals
November 28 – Earl Moore, 84, pitcher who won 163 games between 1901 and 1914 in the American, National and Federal leagues; posted a 20–8 won–lost mark for the 1903 Cleveland Naps, and led the American League in ERA (1.74); also won 22 games for the 1910 Philadelphia Phillies

December
December 5 – Judge Emil Fuchs, 83, cash-strapped owner of the Boston Braves from 1922 to July 31, 1935; managed the Braves himself to a last-place 56–98 record in 1929; one of his final acts as owner was the ill-fated 1935 purchase of Babe Ruth, who batted only .181 with six home runs in 28 games, and retired on May 30
December 8 – Lou Koupal, 62, pitcher who worked in 101 games over six seasons between 1925 and 1937 for four big-league clubs
December 10 – Bert Maxwell, 75, pitched in 21 games over four widely dispersed seasons for 1906 Pittsburgh Pirates, 1908 Philadelphia Athletics, 1911 New York Giants and 1914 Brooklyn Tip-Tops (Federal League)
December 15 – Dummy Hoy, 99, center fielder who scored over 100 runs nine times, and the game's most accomplished deaf player; he threw out the first ball of the 1961 World Series' third game on October 7
December 17 – Ping Bodie, 74, outfielder in 1,050 games for the Chicago White Sox, Philadelphia Athletics and New York Yankees between 1911 and 1921; one of first Italian-Americans to play in the major leagues
December 25 – Frank Foutz, 84, first baseman who played 20 games for the 1901 Baltimore Orioles of the American League
December 25 – Don Savage, 42, third baseman who played in 105 games for the 1944–1945 Yankees
December 31 – Dutch Lieber, 51, relief pitcher for the 1934–1935 Philadelphia Athletics; in 21 games, posted a 1–2 won–lost mark with two saves